Lost Highway: The Concert is the fourth live DVD from American rock band Bon Jovi. The DVD shows the band performing the Lost Highway album in its entirety to an audience of approximately 2,000 people in Chicago Illinois. It is the first time in the band's history that they have performed an entire album in sequence live. After they completed performing the album in its entirety, the band played three of their hits: "It's My Life", "Wanted Dead or Alive" and "Who Says You Can't Go Home". The concert was released as a bonus audio disk with the German and UK version of Lost Highway on May 16, 2008, under the name Lost Highway: Tour Edition.

Performance information

On the songs that have female vocals on the album ("Seat Next to You" and "Till We Ain't Strangers Anymore"), violinist Lorenza Ponce 
sings the parts performed by the original artists on the studio versions.

"Any Other Day" features solos from Bobby Bandiera (rhythm guitar), Kurt Johnston (pedal steel guitar), Lorenza Ponce (violin), David Bryan (keyboards) and finishing with an extended solo from lead guitarist Richie Sambora. This stretches the song to over 8 minutes, double the length of the studio version.

Track listing

Lost Highway
Summertime
(You Want To) Make a Memory
Whole Lot of Leavin'
We Got It Going On
Any Other Day
Seat Next to You
Everybody's Broken
Till We Ain't Strangers Anymore
The Last Night
One Step Closer
I Love This Town
It's My Life
Wanted Dead or Alive
Who Says You Can't Go Home

Technical notes

The European release, while having the correct region coding on the DVD, is still in the American NTSC picture format. The bonus performances are formatted as a 4:3 frame with a letterbox, which when viewed on a widescreen set produces a black area around all sides of the picture (windowboxing).

Band personnel
Bon Jovi
Jon Bon Jovi – vocals, acoustic guitar
Richie Sambora – lead guitar, backing vocals
David Bryan – keyboards, backing vocals
Tico Torres – drums, percussion

Additional musicians
Hugh McDonald – bass
Bobby Bandiera – rhythm guitar, backing vocals
Lorenza Ponce – violin, viola, backing vocals
Kurt Johnston – pedal steel, mandolin

Charts and certifications

Peak positions

Certifications

References

Bon Jovi video albums
2007 video albums
Live video albums
2007 live albums